John Hughes  (16 April 1877 – 5 July 1950) was a Welsh international footballer. He was part of the Wales national football team, playing 3 matches. He played his first match on 6 March 1905 against Scotland and his last match on 8 April 1905 against Ireland. At club level, Hughes played for New Brighton Tower, Aberdare Athletic, Liverpool and Plymouth Argyle.

See also
 List of Wales international footballers (alphabetical)

References

1877 births
Welsh footballers
Wales international footballers
1950 deaths
Association football wing halves
Liverpool F.C. players
Plymouth Argyle F.C. players
English Football League players
New Brighton Tower F.C. players
Aberdare Athletic F.C. players
Sportspeople from Flintshire
Place of death missing